Robert Jay Roth (born 1950) is an American television and film director, screenwriter and producer.

Life and career 
Born and raised in Los Angeles, Roth began his tertiary education at the University of California, Berkeley studying philosophy and creative writing before earning his Bachelor of Arts degree in Cinema at the University of Southern California in 1972. He continued his education at the University of California, Los Angeles enrolling in the Master of Fine Arts program and received his graduate degree in motion picture production in 1975.[1] The following year, he wrote, produced and directed his first film, Independence Day. His 1984 film Heartbreakers was entered into the 35th Berlin International Film Festival.[2] In 1988, Roth wrote and directed the television film Dead Solid Perfect.

Over the course of his career, Roth has written, produced, and directed several television and feature films and episodes.  Television series he has worked on include: Miami Vice, Beverly Hills, 90210, Dr. Quinn, Medicine Woman, Numb3rs, Commander in Chief, Without a Trace, New Amsterdam, Raising the Bar, Criminal Minds, Prison Break, Lost, FlashForward, Fringe, Life Unexpected, V, The Mentalist, Revenge, Breakout Kings, Marvels Agents of S.H.I.E.L.D., Greys Anatomy, Scorpion, Hawaii 5-0, Player and the 2017 reboot of MacGyver among many more.

He was a founding member of the Independent Feature Project and the first Co-Chairman of the DGA's Independent Feature Committee. His films have won countless awards and have been exhibited in over 100 international film festivals. He also teaches film seminars throughout the world and is the recipient of the 2017 Miami Web Fest Lifetime Achievement Award.

Television

Television films

See also 
 Circle of Power (1983)
 Heartbreakers (1984)
 Dead Solid Perfect (1988)
 The Man Inside (1990)

References

External links
 
 Bobby Roth – 2003 San Francisco Jewish Film Festival
 New York Times review of Brave New Girl
 A Director Prepares: Bobby Roth's Masterclass

1950 births
Living people
20th-century American male writers
20th-century American screenwriters
21st-century American male writers
21st-century American screenwriters
American male screenwriters
American television directors
Film directors from Los Angeles
Film producers from California
Screenwriters from California
Television producers from California
UC Berkeley College of Letters and Science alumni
UCLA Film School alumni
USC School of Cinematic Arts alumni
Writers from Los Angeles